Their Social Splash is a 1915 short comedy film featuring Harold Lloyd.

Cast
 Slim Summerville - Harold
 Dixie Chene - Gladys
 Charles Murray - Hogan
 Polly Moran - Polly
 Frank Hayes - The Father
 Harold Lloyd - The Minister
 Harry Gribbon
 Mabel Normand - (unconfirmed)
 Ben Turpin - (unconfirmed)

See also
 Harold Lloyd filmography

References

External links

1915 films
1915 comedy films
1915 short films
American silent short films
American black-and-white films
Films directed by Arvid E. Gillstrom
Films directed by Charles Avery
Silent American comedy films
American comedy short films
1910s American films